Ogwumike is a surname.  Notable people with the surname include:

Chiney Ogwumike (born 1992), Nigerian-American basketball player
Erica Ogwumike (born 1997), Nigerian-American basketball player, sister of Nneka and Chiney
Nneka Ogwumike (born 1990), Nigerian-American basketball player